Mabondo is a commune of the city of Tshikapa in the Democratic Republic of the Congo.

Communes of the Democratic Republic of the Congo
Democratic Republic of Congo geography articles needing translation from French Wikipedia
Tshikapa